The Church of the Annunciation is a church in Rice County, Minnesota in Webster Township near Northfield.  It was designed by John Wheeler, in the Craftsman style, and has an ornamental corner tower.  A study of historic properties in Rice County says that its architecture also includes Shingle Style. The church was originally opened in 1853, and after a lightning strike burned down the original chapel, the current chapel was built and completed in 1913. It continues to operate to this day.

Gallery

See also
 National Register of Historic Places listings in Rice County, Minnesota

References

External links

American Craftsman architecture in Minnesota
Churches in Rice County, Minnesota
Churches in the Roman Catholic Archdiocese of Saint Paul and Minneapolis
Churches on the National Register of Historic Places in Minnesota
Roman Catholic churches completed in 1913
1913 establishments in Minnesota
National Register of Historic Places in Rice County, Minnesota
20th-century Roman Catholic church buildings in the United States